Live from the Backyard is the live DVD concert of Athens, Georgia's Widespread Panic in Austin, Texas, on July 20, 2002.  The DVD features over two hours of music as well as backstage footage and interviews with the band.  The DVD was recorded less than a month after the final performance of lead guitarist Michael Houser, who would shortly die from pancreatic cancer.  George McConnell, who would later officially succeed Houser, plays lead guitar throughout the performance but is credited on the DVD as a "special guest."

Track listing

Disc One
Set One
Weight of the World
Down
Tall Boy
Rock
Little Lily
Sleeping Man
Trouble
Doreatha
Sometimes

Set Two
Bayou Lena
Give
Old Neighborhood
Get In Get Out
Stop Breakin' Down Blues
Jam
Drums
Pickin' Up the Pieces
Christmas Katie
Action Man

Encore
Old Joe
Blue Indian
Imitation Leather Shoes

Disc Two
Movie/Behind the Scenes Collage
Exclusive Band Interview
Panic Pastimes
Meet the Crew
Photo Gallery

Personnel

Widespread Panic
John Bell – Vocals, Guitar
John "JoJo" Hermann – Keyboards, Vocals
Todd Nance – Drums, Vocals
Domingo S. Ortiz – Percussion, Vocals
David Schools – Bass, Vocals

Guest musicians
Randall Bramblett** – Saxophone, Vocals (Courtesy of New West Records)
George McConnell – Guitar, Vocals
Sitting in 
Cody Dickinson – Percussion
Luther Dickinson – Guitar
Note: Cody and Luther Dickinson of North Mississippi Allstars appear courtesy of Tone-Cool Records

Production
Michael Drumm – Director and Producer
Jon Obenchain & Amy Weller – Editors
Dan Russo & Meg Harkins – Producers for Sanctuary Records
Buck Williams – Producer for Widespread Panic
John Keane (at John Keane Studios) – Audio Mixer
Assisted by Chris Byron
Mark Waldrep, AIX Media Group – Audio Editing and Mastering, Authored
Sam Lanier & Brown Cat, Inc., Buck Williams – Management
Billy Perkins – Cover Design
Smay Vision – Package Design
Jackie Jasper – Photo

Widespread Panic video albums
2003 live albums
2003 video albums
Live video albums